The following tables show state-by-state results in the Australian Senate at the 1993 federal election. Senators total 34 coalition (29 Liberal, four coalition National, one CLP), 30 Labor, two Green, two non-coalition National, seven Democrats, and one Independent. Senator terms are six years (three for territories), and took their seats from 1 July 1993, except the territories who took their seats immediately.

Australia

New South Wales

Victoria

Queensland

Western Australia

South Australia

Tasmania

Australian Capital Territory

Northern Territory

See also

1993 Australian federal election
Candidates of the 1993 Australian federal election
Members of the Australian Senate, 1993–1996

Notes

References

External links
Adam Carr's Election Archive

1993 elections in Australia
Senate 1993
Australian Senate elections